Qiang Xiaochu (1918–2007) was a People's Republic of China politician. He was born in Zichang County, Yan'an, Shaanxi Province. He was Communist Party of China Committee Secretary of Jilin Province.

1918 births
2007 deaths
People's Republic of China politicians from Shaanxi
Chinese Communist Party politicians from Shaanxi
Political office-holders in Jilin
Vice-governors of Shandong
Members of the 12th Central Committee of the Chinese Communist Party
Members of the Central Advisory Commission